The Barbary Coast Trail is a marked trail that connects a series of historic sites and several local history museums in San Francisco, California. Approximately 180 bronze medallions and arrows embedded in the sidewalk mark the 3.8-mile (6.1 km) trail.

The historic sites of the Barbary Coast Trail relate primarily to the period from the California Gold Rush of 1849 to the Earthquake and Fire of 1906, a period when San Francisco grew from a small village to an important shipping port.

Sites along the trail include the Old Mint, a national historic landmark; Union Square; Maiden Lane; Old St. Mary's Cathedral, first Catholic cathedral West of the Rockies; T'ien Hou temple, one of the oldest still-operating Chinese temples in the United States; Wells Fargo History Museum; Pony Express headquarters site; Jackson Square Historic District, which contains the last cluster of Gold Rush and Barbary Coast-era buildings in San Francisco;  The Old Ship Saloon, once a shanghaiing den; Coit Tower; Fisherman's Wharf; SF Maritime National Historical Park, which maintains a large collection of historic ships; and Ghirardelli Square.

Each end of the Barbary Coast Trail is connected by the Hyde-Powell cable car line, itself a national historic landmark.

History 
The Barbary Coast Trail was founded by historian Daniel Bacon in collaboration with the San Francisco Historical Society. The trail was inaugurated in May 1998 and was originally marked with painted images as trail markers. The images were replaced over time with bronze medallions designed by Daniel Bacon and illustrator Jim Blair.  By the year 2015, approximately 180 medallions had been placed in total.

Major trail sites
Major Trail Sites are listed in their order of appearance on the trail when starting at the southern end

 San Francisco Mint
  Market Street
  Union Square
  Maiden Lane
  The Dragon Gate
 Waverly Place
 Tin How Temple
 Chinese Telephone Exchange
 Wells Fargo History Museum
 Belli Building
 Hotaling Building
 Bella Union
 Vesuvio Cafe
 City Lights Bookstore
  Washington Square
 Coit Tower
  Fisherman's Wharf
 Hyde Street Pier
 Buena Vista Cafe
 San Francisco cable car system

See also 

Barbary Coast, San Francisco
 49-Mile Scenic Drive
 Chinatown
 Hallidie Plaza
 International Settlement (San Francisco)
 Nob Hill
 Portsmouth Square
 The Embarcadero

References

External links 
 

1998 establishments in California
Historic trails and roads in California
History of San Francisco
Landmarks in San Francisco
Trails in the San Francisco Bay Area
Nob Hill, San Francisco
Chinatown, San Francisco
Russian Hill, San Francisco
North Beach, San Francisco
Financial District, San Francisco
Fisherman's Wharf, San Francisco
California Gold Rush
South of Market, San Francisco
Barbary Coast, San Francisco
Tourist attractions in San Francisco
Gold rush trails and roads